Tillandsia walter-tillii is a species of flowering plant in the family Bromeliaceae, endemic to Ecuador. Its natural habitat is subtropical or tropical moist montane forests. It is threatened by habitat loss. It was first described by José Manuel Manzanares in 1998 as Vriesia tillii. When Jason Randall Grant transferred it to the genus Tillandsia in 2004, the epithet had to be changed because the combination Tillandsia tillii was already in use for a different species. Tillandsia walter-tillii is a replacement name.

References

 Manzanares, J. M. 1998. Vriesea tillii, a new species from Ecuador. Journal of the Bromeliad Society 48: 169–171.

walter-tillii
Endemic flora of Ecuador
Vulnerable plants
Plants described in 1998